Marin Radu (born 15 March 1956) is a retired Romanian football striker and manager, best known for his playing stints with Argeș Pitești and Steaua București. His brother, Nicolae was also a footballer who played at Argeș Pitești, they managed to win the 1978–79 Divizia A championship together.

International career
Marin Radu played 7 games at international level for Romania, making his debut on 12 May 1976 when coach Ștefan Kovács sent him on the field in the 60th minute to replace Stelian Anghel in a 1–0 away loss against Bulgaria at the 1973–76 Balkan Cup first leg final, also appearing in the 3–2 home victory in the second leg of the final. His third game was also against Bulgaria, a 2–0 home victory at the successful 1977–80 Balkan Cup. Radu also played in a 1–1 against Cyprus at the Euro 1980 qualifiers. His last appearance for the national team was in a 1982 friendly against East Germany which ended with a 4–1 loss.

Honours

Club
Argeș Pitești
Divizia A: 1978–79
Steaua București
Divizia A: 1984–85, 1985–86
Cupa României: 1984–85
European Cup: 1985–86
Inter Sibiu
Divizia B: 1987–88

International
Romania
Balkan Cup: 1977–80, runner-up 1973–76

Stats
Total matches played in Romanian First League: 385 matches – 191 goals
Topscorer of Romanian First League: 1979, 1981
European Cups: 23 matches – 4 goals
"B" national team: 1 match – 0 goals
Olympic team: 5 matches – 1 goal
U-23 national team: 6 matches – 0 goals
U-21 national team: 16 matches – 10 goals

Notes

References

External links
 
 
 

1956 births
People from Argeș County
Romanian footballers
Romania international footballers
FC Argeș Pitești players
FC Steaua București players
FC Olt Scornicești players
Living people
Liga I players
Liga II players
Association football forwards
Romanian football managers
LPS HD Clinceni managers